William Pikerell (also Pickerill) was an English medieval university chancellor.

During 1284–5, Pikerell was Chancellor of the University of Oxford.

References

Year of birth unknown
Year of death unknown
Chancellors of the University of Oxford
13th-century English people